Kompia is a subgenus of the mosquito genus Aedes.

Species 
Aedes purpureipes

References 

Aedes
Insect subgenera